The Exit... Stage Left Tour was a concert tour by Canadian rock band Rush, in support of the band's second live album Exit... Stage Left and its accompanying video.

Background
The European leg of the tour was supported by Girlschool. Riot was the opening act for the band on the North American leg, performing in arenas.

Setlist
This is an example setlist adapted from Rush: Wandering the Face of the Earth – The Official Touring History of what were performed during the tour, but may not represent the majority of the shows. The setlist was similar to the setlist from the previous tour, but featured the song "Subdivisions" which would later be featured on the band's 1982 studio album Signals. "New World Man" and "Chemistry" were both performed only at the soundchecks before a show.

"2112: Overture/Temples of Syrinx"
"Freewill"
"Limelight"
"Book II: Hemispheres – Prelude"
"Beneath, Between and Behind"
"Subdivisions"
"The Camera Eye"
"YYZ"
"Broon's Bane"
"The Trees"
"Xanadu"
"The Spirit of Radio"
"Red Barchetta"
"Closer to the Heart"
"Tom Sawyer"
"Vital Signs"
"Working Man"
"Book II: Hemispheres – Armageddon"
"By-Tor and the Snow Dog"
"In the End"
"In the Mood"
"2112: Grand Finale"
Encore
"La Villa Strangiato"

Tour dates

Box office score data

Personnel
 Geddy Lee – vocals, bass, keyboards
 Alex Lifeson – guitar, backing vocals
 Neil Peart – drums

References

Citations

Sources
 
 
 

Rush (band) concert tours
1981 concert tours
Concert tours of North America
Concert tours of the United States
Concert tours of the United Kingdom
Concert tours of Germany
Concert tours of the Netherlands